Freddy Lussick (born 28 August 2000) is a professional rugby league footballer who plays as a  for the New Zealand Warriors in the National Rugby League. 

He previously played for the Sydney Roosters and the St. George Illawarra Dragons in the National Rugby League.

Background
Freddy is the youngest brother of professional rugby league players, Darcy Lussick and Joey Lussick.

Before making his first grade debut for the Sydney Roosters, Lussick played in the NSW Cup for North Sydney.

Career

2020
Lussick made his first grade debut in round 15 of the 2020 NRL season for the Sydney Roosters against the Wests Tigers.

2021
Lussick made his debut for St. George Illawarra Dragons in Round 24 for a loan deal replacing Andrew McCullough. He did 2 offloads and thirty one tackles for St. George Illawarra. He ran a total of 57 meters. Lussick only got 32 Fantasy Points in NRL Fantasy. Lussick lost both of his games in Round 24 and 25.

2022
Lussick made a total of 11 appearances for the New Zealand Warriors in the 2022 NRL season as they finished 15th on the table.

References

2000 births
Living people
Australian rugby league players
New Zealand Warriors players
North Sydney Bears NSW Cup players
Rugby league hookers
Rugby league players from Sydney
Sydney Roosters players
St. George Illawarra Dragons players